Liam Robert Thomas (born 20 July 1994) is an Australian professional basketball player who is currently a free agent. He played college basketball for Nicholls State.

High school career
Thomas played basketball for Central Private School in Central, Louisiana. As a senior, he averaged 14.1 points, 10.5 rebounds and 9.1 blocks per game. Thomas recorded 10 points, eight rebounds and eight blocks to lead his team to its first ever Mississippi Association of Independent Schools title.

College career
Thomas was a four-year college basketball starter at Nicholls State. His coach J. P. Piper wanted to redshirt him for his first year, but Thomas did not agree with the idea. Thomas posted 8.8 points, 5.2 rebounds, and 2.5 blocks per game as a junior. As a junior, Thomas blocked 85 shots, a single-season school record, and became his program's all-time leader in blocks. In his senior season, he led the NCAA Division I with 4.19 blocks per game and 130 blocks, while averaging 7.8 points and 6.4 rebounds per game. Thomas was named Southland Defensive Player of the Year and Third Team All-Southland. He left with the third-most blocks in Southland history.

Professional career
After going undrafted in the 2017 NBA draft, Thomas signed with AV Ohrid of the Macedonian First League and ABA League Second Division. On 28 November 2017, he was released by the club. In the 2018–19 season, Thomas joined the Sydney Kings of the Australian National Basketball League as a development player. He signed with the Diamond Valley Eagles of the semi-professional NBL1 on 22 February 2019. For his next season, Thomas played for the Sutherland Sharks of the semi-professional Waratah League.

References

External links
Nicholls State Colonels bio

1994 births
Living people
Australian men's basketball players
Australian expatriate basketball people in the United States
Basketball players from Sydney
Nicholls Colonels men's basketball players
Power forwards (basketball)